Chionodes nebulosella is a moth of the family Gelechiidae. It is found in France, Germany, Austria, Italy, the Czech Republic, Slovenia, Serbia and Bosnia and Herzegovina.

References

Moths described in 1870
Chionodes
Moths of Europe
Taxa named by Hermann von Heinemann